Megachile facetula is a species of bee in the family Megachilidae. It was described by Theodore Dru Alison Cockerell in 1918.

References

Facetula
Insects described in 1918